A constitutional referendum was held in the Northern Mariana Islands on 2 November 2010, alongside the election for the islands' representative to the United States House of Representatives. Voters were asked whether they approved of three proposed amendments to the constitution. All three were rejected.

Background
One of the three proposals was for the government to issue bonds to pay for the country's pension scheme. It would involve adding a new section to chapter X of the constitution:

The second amendment was to set in law the financing of compensation paid to residents for land expropriation. This would involve amending subsection g of section 5 (Chapter XI) of the constitution:

The third amendment concerned limiting a rise in pension payments to the level of secured financing. It proposed adding a new subsection c to Chapter III, section of the constitution:

Results

References

2010 referendums
2010 in the Northern Mariana Islands
Constitutional referendums in the Northern Mariana Islands